The Indian locomotive class WAG-5 is a class of 25 kV AC electric locomotives that was developed in 1978 by Chittaranjan Locomotive Works for Indian Railways. The model name stands for broad gauge (W), alternating current (A), goods traffic (G) engine, 5th generation (5). They entered service in 1980. A total of 1196 WAG-5 were built at CLW and BHEL between 1978 and 1998, which made them the most numerous class of mainline electric locomotive till its successor the WAG-7.

The WAG-5 is one of the most successful locomotives of Indian Railways currently serving both freight and passenger trains for over  43 years. This class provided the basic design for a number of other locomotives, like WAG-7 and the WCM-6. However, with the advent of new 3-phase locomotives like WAG-9 and WAG-12, the WAG-5 locomotives were relegated to hauling smaller passenger trains and now the aging fleet the WAG-5 locomotives are rapidly being withdrawn from mainline duties and scrapped.

History 
WAG-5A is the one with Alstom traction motors. WAG-5B is a converted WAM-4. WAG-5H(x) is with Hitachi traction motors. WAG-5P(x) is a passenger dedicated class. WAG-5(x)D are fitted with dual brakes and WAG-5(x)E are fitted with air brakes. WAG-5RH and WAG-5HR are fitted with Rheostatic or Friction braking. Another variant is WAG-5HG. The units with additional '6P' markings have all parallel grouped traction motors. WAG-5HB is built by BHEL. Some units are fitted with Static Converter(STC), Microprocessor, Dynamic brake resistors(DBR) and SI unit. Due to the advent of WAG-7 and WAG-9, these locos except WAG-5HA/HB are even used for passenger trains although it is a freight-dedicated locomotive. WAG-5HB is homed at Jhansi shed near BHEL's installations for maintenance purposes. WAG-5 has a shell of the WAM-4. Units numbered till 23293 have side Louvre and round glass windows like the WAM-4 and units after 23293 have WAG-7 style of Louvre for better ventilation. Recently, WAG-5 have been fitted with data loggers. Unit numbered 23026 was selected by RDSO for adoption of thyristor controlled electricals in 1995. This was done due to the loss of suppliers of tap changer control. Project began in 1992. The new prototype system built in collaboration with Bhabha Atomic Research Centre was fitted in the locomotive between 1997 and 1998. However, due to several problems like interference with signalling equipment, the project was ceased in 1999. The engine was rebuilt to original WAG-5 and designated as WAG-5P.

Technical Specification

Locomotive sheds

See also
Locomotives of India
Rail transport in India

References

External links

http://www.irfca.org/faq/faq-specs.html#WAG-5
Electric locomotives in India
India railway fan club

Electric locomotives of India
25 kV AC locomotives
Co-Co locomotives
Railway locomotives introduced in 1978
5 ft 6 in gauge locomotives